Pro Juventute is a charitable foundation in Switzerland established in 1912. It is dedicated to supporting the rights and needs of Swiss children and youth.

Since 1913, the Swiss post office has issued an annual charity stamp series to support the work of Pro Juventute.

Until the 1970s, the semi-official policy of institutionalizing Yenish parents and having their children adopted by more "normal" Swiss citizens was carried out by Pro Juventute on behalf of the Swiss government. The name of this program was Kinder der Landstrasse ("children of the road").

External links
 Official website.
 The Pro Juventute stamps, on Timbressuisses.ch ; retrieved 19 April 2009.

1912 establishments in Switzerland
Foundations based in Switzerland
Youth organisations based in Switzerland
Non-profit organisations based in Switzerland
Philatelic terminology
Philately of Switzerland
Yenish people